The Albanian local elections in 2003 was the fourth local election held in Albania.

Further reading
OSCE report
OSCE report

References

Albania
Local elections
2003